SEM can refer to:

Computing 

 Search engine marketing, promoting websites by increasing their visibility in search engine results
 Security event manager, a security log tool used on data networks

Economics and management 
 Stock Exchange of Mauritius, the principal stock exchange of the island country of Mauritius
 Strategic enrollment management, an element of planning for new growth at a university or college

Energy
 Single Electricity Market, the integration of the electricity sectors of the  Republic of Ireland and Northern Ireland in a single market
 Strategic energy management, continuous improvement process for energy efficiency based on behavioral change

Mathematics and statistics 

 Structural equation modeling, in data analysis
 Simultaneous equations model, in econometrics
 Standard error of the mean in statistics

Places 

 Craig Field (Alabama), US airport, IATA code
 Sem, Ariège, France
 Sem, Norway

Science and technology 

 Scanning electron microscope
 Space Experiment Module, of the Freestar experiment on space shuttle Columbia
 Synthesizer expansion module in an Oberheim Electronics synthesizer
 Sistema Eléctrico de Magallanes, an electrical power grid of Chile
 SEM, instrument (seismometer) of the Surface Science Platform (Kazachok) mission ExoMars 2022
 A protecting group in organic chemistry, see 2-(trimethylsilyl)ethoxymethyl chloride (SEM-Cl)

Schools, organisations, societies 

 The School of Ecclesiastic Music the school of Byzantine Music in Mount Lebanon
 Swedish Evangelical Mission
 Society for Ethnomusicology, an ethnomusicology in Indiana, US
 Science and Engineering Magnet, a school in Dallas, Texas, US
 S.E.M. Group civil engineering company based in South Australia
 Steam Engine Makers' Society, early British trade union
 Shandong Engineering Machinery, owned by Caterpillar Inc.

People
 Shem or Sem, one of the sons of Noah, as depicted in the Bible
 Sem (given name), a usually masculine given name
 Sem (artist) (1863–1934), French caricaturist
 Elise Sem (1870–1950), Norwegian barrister, women's activist, and sports official
 Ingebjørg Dahl Sem (born 1938), Norwegian Christian writer
 Ingebjørg Sem (1931–2009), Norwegian actress
 John Sem (born 1973), Papua New Guinean Olympic boxer
 Niels Arntzen Sem (1782–1859), Norwegian politician
 Suy Sem (born 1947), Cambodian politician

Other 
 Super Étendard Modernisé, a French fighter aircraft
 Self-evaluation maintenance theory, a psychological theory of self
 New Austrian tunnelling method or Sequential Excavation Method
 Sports and exercise medicine